John Olivier de Villiers (28 February 1930 – 3 July 1969) was a South African first-class cricketer.

de Villiers was born at Cape Town in February 1930. He later studied in England at University College at the University of Oxford. While studying at Oxford, he played first-class cricket for Oxford University, making his debut against Nottinghamshire at Oxford in 1951. He played first-class cricket for Oxford until 1952, making eight appearances. He scored a total of 237 runs in these eight matches, at an average of 21.54 and a high score of 81. 

de Villers returned to South Africa after completing his studies, where he played for Orange Free State in the 1953/54 season, making three first-class appearances against the touring New Zealanders, Border and Transvaal. He scored 110 runs in these matches, with a high score of 24. de Villiers died at Tarkastad in July 1969.

References

External links

1930 births
1969 deaths
People from Cape Town
Alumni of University College, Oxford
South African cricketers
Oxford University cricketers
Free State cricketers